The Game is the debut studio album recorded by Canadian singer and songwriter Alyssa Reid. It was released in Canada on June 21, 2011, by Wax Records. Internationally, the album was distributed by Ultra Records and was released to digital retailers in the United States in May 2013. "The Game" spawned three successful singles, including the worldwide hit "Alone Again".

Background
After garnering exposure following a Top 6 placement on the first season of The Next Star, Reid caught the attention of Wax Records executive Jamie Appleby through her viral video for "One Less Lonely Boy" (a rebuttal song to Justin Bieber's "One Less Lonely Girl" and signed a recording contract with Wax Records in 2009. Between 2010 and 2011, Reid wrote and recorded songs that would comprise The Game.

Singles
"Alone Again" serves as the first single and features Canadian rapper P Reign. The song heavily samples lyrics from Heart's 1987 hit "Alone". It was first released in Canada on December 7, 2010. The song was a domestic success, reaching 11 on the Canadian Hot 100 and being certified Gold by Music Canada. It was later re-issued in Europe with a featured vocal from the Jump Smokers in place of P. Reign. This version charted in Belgium, Ireland, the Netherlands, Scotland, and the United Kingdom, reaching the number two position on the national singles charts of the latter two.

The album's title track, "The Game", was released as the second single in May 2011. It earned Reid her second consecutive top 40 single in Canada. In 2012, a new version was recorded for the UK market and features rap vocals from Snoop Dogg.

"Talk Me Down" was serviced to Canadian radio in January 2012 as the third single from the album. The song's accompanying music video features an anti-bullying storyline and promoted Kids Help Phone, a Canadian telephone counselling service.

Track listing

Chart performance

Release history

References 

2011 debut albums
Alyssa Reid albums